Walkout Creek Cone is a cinder cone in northwestern British Columbia, Canada. It is one of the volcanoes that produced young basaltic lava flows in the central portion of the Mount Edziza volcanic complex in the past 10,000 years. These basaltic lava flows form a volcanic field called the Snowshoe Lava Field.

See also
List of volcanoes in Canada
List of Northern Cordilleran volcanoes
Volcanism of Canada
Volcanism of Western Canada

References

Cinder cones of British Columbia
Mount Edziza volcanic complex
One-thousanders of British Columbia